Carex fuscolutea is a tussock-forming species of perennial sedge in the family Cyperaceae. It is native to parts of northern Mexico.

The species was first formally described by the botanist Johann Otto Boeckeler in 1886 as a part of the work Botanische Jahrbücher für Systematik, Pflanzengeschichte und Pflanzengeographie.

See also
List of Carex species

References

fuscolutea
Taxa named by Johann Otto Boeckeler
Plants described in 1886
Flora of Mexico